A cleft is an opening, fissure, or V-shaped indentation.

Cleft may refer to:

Linguistics
 A cleft sentence, a type of grammatical construction

Anatomy

 Cleft lip and palate, a congenital deformity
 A cleft chin, a dimple on the chin
 The pudendal cleft, part of the female genitalia
 Intergluteal cleft, the groove between the buttocks

Places

 Cleft Island (Antarctica)
 Cleft Island (Victoria)
 Cleft Ledge
 Cleft Point
 Cleft Peak
 Cleft Rock

Fiction
 The Cleft, a novel by 2007 Nobel prize laureate Doris Lessing
 The Cleft, a location in Age of D'ni from the computer game Myst
 Cleft, the Boy Chin Wonder, a character in The Fairly Odd Parents
 Rainbow Cleft (Cirith Ninniach), a minor place in Beleriand, J. R. R. Tolkien's Middle-earth legendarium.

See also
 Cleave (disambiguation), the present tense of the past participle "cleft"